The Freedom 30 is an American sailboat, that was designed by Gary Mull and first built in 1986. The design is out of production.

Production
The boat was built by Tillotson Pearson in the United States for Freedom Yachts, starting in 1986.

Design
The Freedom 30 is a small recreational keelboat, built predominantly of fiberglass, with wood trim. It has a free-standing fractional rigged sloop rig, an internally-mounted spade-type rudder and a fixed fin keel. It displaces  and carries  of lead ballast.

The boat has a PHRF racing average handicap of 171 with a high of 174 and low of 171.

Variants
Freedom 30
Freedom 30 SD
Freedom 32 and 32-2
Model renamed in 1988, with the addition of a boarding and swimming platform to the stern.

See also
List of sailing boat types

References

Keelboats
1980s sailboat type designs
Sailing yachts
Sailboat type designs by Gary Mull
Sailboat types built by Pearson Yachts